Doddridge Chapel and Cemetery is a historic chapel and cemetery located in Washington Township, Wayne County, Indiana. The chapel was built in 1876, and is a one-story, rectangular, Italianate style brick building. It sits on a limestone foundation and has a gable roof topped by a belfry and steeple. The cemetery was established in 1818, and hold approximately 450 graves.

It was added to the National Register of Historic Places in 2003.

References

External links
 

Churches on the National Register of Historic Places in Indiana
Cemeteries on the National Register of Historic Places in Indiana
Italianate architecture in Indiana
1818 establishments in Indiana
Churches completed in 1876
Churches in Wayne County, Indiana
National Register of Historic Places in Wayne County, Indiana
Cemeteries in Indiana
Italianate church buildings in the United States